Tryphera is a genus of flies in the family Tachinidae.

Species
T. lugubris (Meigen, 1824)

References

Diptera of North America
Diptera of Europe
Exoristinae
Tachinidae genera
Taxa named by Johann Wilhelm Meigen